Hünegg Castle is a castle in the municipality of Hilterfingen of the Canton of Bern in Switzerland.  It is a Swiss heritage site of national significance.

History
Hünegg Castle was built between 1861 and 1863 for the Prussian Baron Albert Emil Otto von Parpart.  However, he was only able to enjoy the castle for a few years, since he died in 1869.  By 1883, it had passed to his nephew, who sold off the art collection and then in 1893 sold the castle to the Berlin commercial judge Karl Lehmann.  He owned the property for only six years before it was acquired by Gustav Lemke-Schuckert, an architect from Wiesbaden, who renovated the interior in the Art Nouveau style.  At about the beginning of the Second World War, the castle was sold to Oscar Haag from Küsnacht, who in 1958 sold it to the Canton of Bern.  Today it houses the Renaissance Revival and Art Nouveau Museum.

The interior has been meticulously preserved or recreated to give the impression that the 19th century owners have just left.

Special exhibitions 
The castle and its park are available for hire for temporary exhibitions. As an example, a Mountain railways special exhibition took place in 2012, 2013, and 2014, from May to October.

Mountain railways special exhibition
The Swiss Mountain Railways Special Exhibition was mounted between May and October 2012, and again between May and October 2013. It was scheduled to return again in 2014.

Mounted by Robert Ganz and Roger Rieker, the special exhibitions were about the early pioneer work of the Swiss mountain railways, with a budget of 95,000 Swiss Francs, the exhibition included loaned objects from 130 individuals and 30 companies, to provide visitors with an overview of rack- and adhesion railways, funicular railways, aerial cableways, ski lifts, and other mountain transportation mechanisms. The loaned objects included several original objects, approximately 200 featured detailed model reproductions, over 500 photographs, over 100 documents, and ten video presentations.

Bibliography 
 Robert Ganz, Roger Rieker: Bau und Betrieb Schweizerischer Bergbahnen, Historischer Querschnitt, Sonderausstellung im Schloss Hünegg Hilterfingen, authors publisher, Jost Druck Hünibach 2013

Notes

References

External links 

 http://www.schlosshuenegg.ch/ Home page of Schloss Hünegg
 https://web.archive.org/web/20140301091154/http://www.bergbahnausstellung.ch/ Home page of mountain railways exhibition in the Hünegg Castel

Cultural property of national significance in the canton of Bern
Castles in the Canton of Bern
Art Nouveau architecture in Switzerland
Art Nouveau houses